Scott is a surname of Scottish origin. It is first attributed to Uchtredus filius Scoti who is mentioned in the charter recording the foundation of Holyrood Abbey and Selkirk in 1120, the border Riding clans who settled Peeblesshire in the 10th century and the family lineage of the Duke of Buccleuch.

Etymology and history of the surname

The surname Scott (Scot, Scotts, Scutt, Scotter) as opposed to its earlier unrelated usage first appears in the 12th century and derives from the Anglo-Scottish border and its medieval border clans. Scott is one of the twelve most common surnames in Scotland. Clan Scott was one of the most powerful of the Riding clans of the Scottish borders and rose to power in the turbulent, often violent region, where they conducted fierce raids and battles with neighbouring clans.

The surname appears in Kent, England by the 14th century, the family of Scot's Hall being a notable example. Descent is thought to be from Alexander de Balliol or William de Balliol le Scot, brothers of John de Balliol King of Scotland, or from retainers of King David I of Scotland who held lands from the Earl of Huntingdon. By the 17th century the name is first recorded in Ireland as a surname. There is no evidence the surname may have originated with the first Gaelic settlers from Ireland despite its use as a marker for a Gael by the Romans. Moreover, in the medieval period the surname was associated with the Kingdom of Scotland rather than an early Irish medieval Gaelic kingdom Dalriada who did not refer to themselves as such, even though separate sources claim that the name was derived from the Scots who invaded Dalriada (Argyll) from Ireland.

People

People with the surname 

 Reginald Scot, author of "The Discoverie of Witchcraft"
 Scot's Hall, a landed family based in Kent, England
 Scott (baseball), a 19th-century American professional baseball player whose given name is unknown
 Scott Baronets of Great Barr, a baronetage of the United Kingdom created in 1806 
 Aaron Scott (footballer) (born 1986), New Zealand footballer
 Adam Scott (golfer) (born 1980), Australian golfer
 Adam Scott (actor) (born 1973), American actor
 Adrian Gilbert Scott (1882–1963), English ecclesiastical architect
 Adrienne Williams Scott, American ophthalmologist 
 Alexander Walker Scott (1800–1883), entomologist
 Alfred Angas Scott (1875–1923), British motorcycle designer, founder of the Scott Motorcycle Company
 Allan Scott, several people
 Amber Scott, Australian ballet dancer
 Andrew Scott, several people
 Ann London Scott (1929–1975), American feminist
 Anne Firor Scott (1921–2019), American historian
 Barbara Ann Scott (1928–2012), Canadian figure-skater
 Barry Scott, several people
 Beckie Scott (born 1974), Canadian cross-country skier
 Ben Scott (disambiguation), several people
 Benjamin Scott (1814–1892), Chamberlain of London
 Bill Scott, several people
 Bobby Scott (U.S. politician) (born 1947), American politician from Virginia
 Bon Scott (1946–1980), Scottish-born Australian rock musician, AC/DC
 Boston Scott (born 1995), American football player
 Brandon Scott (born 1981), American actor, voice actor and producer
 Bruce Scott, several people
 Byron Scott (born 1961), American basketball coach
 Byron N. Scott (1903–1991), American lawyer and politician
 Camilla Scott (born 1961), Canadian actress and television hostess
 Campbell Scott (born 1961), American actor, director, producer and voice artist
 Carlo Scott,(born 1980), South African Footballer
 Clara H. Scott (1841–1897), American composer, hymnwriter and publisher
 Clive Scott (1945–2009), British musician and songwriter
 Corey Scott (1968–1997), American motorcycle stunt rider
 Cyril Scott (1879–1970), English composer, writer, and poet
 Da'Mari Scott (born 1995), American football player
 Dana Scott (born 1932), American mathematician
 Daniel Scott (writer) (born 1963), American writer
 Danielle Scott-Arruda (née Scott) (born 1972), American Olympic indoor volleyball player
 Darrell Scott (born 1959), American songwriter
 Darryl Scott (born 1968), American baseball player and coach
 David Scott, several people
 Deborah Lynn Scott (born 1954), American costume designer
 Delontae Scott (born 1997), American football player
 Devon Scott (born 1958), American actress
 Devon Scott (basketball) (born 1994), American basketball player
 Dick Scott, several people
 Doug Scott (1941–2020), English mountaineer
 Douglas Scott (1926–1996), writer of thrillers often based during the Second World War
 Dred Scott (c. 1799 – 1858), American slave, subject of famous 19th-century US Supreme Court case
 Drew Scott (born 1978), Canadian television personality
 Duncan Campbell Scott (1862–1947), Canadian bureaucrat, poet, and writer
 Durand Scott, Jamaican-American basketball player for Maccabi Ashdod B.C. of the Liga Leumit
 Édouard-Léon Scott de Martinville (1817–1879), French printer and bookseller, inventor of the phonautograph, the earliest known sound recording device
 Edward Scott, several people
 Eleanor Scott, British archaeologist
 Elisabeth Scott (1898–1972), British architect
 Elizabeth Scott, several people
 Elmon Scott (1853–1921), associate justice and chief justice of the Washington Supreme Court
 Emily Scott (DJ) (born 1983), Australian model, disk jockey, record producer, and television personality
 Eric Oswald Gale Scott (1899-1986), Australian zoologist, teacher and pacifist, son of Herbert Hedley Scott
 Eva Mae Fleming Scott (1926–2019), American pharmacist, businesswoman, and politician
 Ernest Scott (1867–1939), Australian historian 
 Eugenie Carol Scott (born 1945), American physical anthropologist
 Frederick Scott, several people
 Gary Scott, several people
 Gene Scott (1929–2005), American pastor, religious broadcaster, and teacher
 George Scott, several people
 Gregory K. Scott (1948-2021), American judge
 Gustavus Scott (1753–1800), American lawyer and public official from Maryland
 Gustavus H. Scott (1812–1882), United States Navy admiral
 Guy C. Scott (1863–1909), American jurist
 Hal Scott (1923–2010), American sportscaster
 Hardie Scott (1907–1999), United States congressman from Pennsylvania
 Harold Scott, several people 
 Herbert Scott, several people
 Hermon Hosmer Scott (1909–1975), American hi-fi engineer
 Hew Scott (1791–1872), Scottish church minister and author
 Hillary Scott (singer) (born 1986), American singer-songwriter, Lady Antebellum
 Hillary Scott (actress) (born 1983), American actress
 Hugh Scott (1900–1994), American lawyer and United States congressman and senator from Pennsylvania
 Hugh L. Scott (1853–1934), United States Army general and Chief of Staff
 Ian Scott (Ontario politician) (1934–2006), Canadian politician from Ontario, Attorney-General of Ontario from 1985 to 1990
 Isaac Scott (musician) (1945–2001), American blues guitarist and singer
 Jacqueline Scott (1931–2020), American actress
 Jake Scott, several people
 Jaleel Scott (born 1995), American football player
 James Scott, several people
 Jamie Scott (basketball) (born 1994), American–Canadian women's player
 Jason Scott, several people
 Jerry Scott (curler), American curler
 Jill Scott (born 1972), American singer-songwriter
 Jill Scott (footballer) (born 1987), association footballer
 Jim Scott (footballer) (born 1940), Scottish footballer
 Jimmy Scott (1925–2014), American jazz vocalist
 J. K. Scott (born 1996), American football player
 Jo-Vaughn Scott (born 1995), American rapper and actor known professionally as Joey Badass
 Joanna Scott (born 1960), American author, professor at the University of Rochester
 John Scott, several people
 Josh Scott (born 1985), English footballer
 Josh Scott (basketball) (born 1993), American basketball player
 Josiah Scott, several people
 Julia H. Scott (1809–1842), American poet
 Kathryn Leigh Scott, American actress and writer
 Katie Scott (born 1958), British art historian
 Kaye Scott, Australian boxer
 Kenneth E. Scott, American lawyer
 Larry Scott (bodybuilder) (1938–2014), American bodybuilder
 Lation Scott (1893-1917), African American lynching victim
 Lawrence Scott (born 1943), Trinidadian writer
 Lee Scott, several people
 Lefty Scott (1915–1964), American baseball player
 Lewis Allaire Scott (1759–1798), American politician, New York Secretary of State, 1789–93
 Lizabeth Scott (1922–2015), American actress
 Lottie B. Scott (born 1936), American civic leader and civil rights advocate
 Mabel Julienne Scott (1892–1976), American actress
 Maddy Scott, Canadian person who has been missing since 2011
 Margaret Scott, several people
 Martha Scott (1912–2003), American actress
 Matthew Scott, several people
 Michael Scott, several people
 Montagu Scott (1818–1900), English Conservative politician, Member of Parliament for East Sussex from 1874 to 1880
 Montague Scott (1835–1909), Australian artist
 Morrys Scott (born 1970), Welsh footballer
 Munro Briggs Scott (1889–1917), Scottish botanist and British officer
 Naomi Scott (born 1993), English actress and singer
 Nell Scott, American politician
 Nick Scott, multiple people
 Niles Scott (born 1995), American football player
 Olive Scott (1924–2007), English paediatric cardiologist
 Otho Scott (died 1864), American politician and lawyer
 Pamela Scott Wilkie (born 1937), British artist
 Patrick Scott, several people
 Percy Scott (1853–1924), British admiral and naval gunnery pioneer
 Peter Scott, several people
 Phil Scott (1900–1983), English boxer
 Phil Scott, American politician, Governor of Vermont
 Philippa Scott (1918–2010), British champion of wildlife conservation
 Rachel Scott (1981–1999), American murder victim, the first shot in the Columbine massacre
 Rachel Scott (women's education reformer) née Cook (1848 – 1905), British women's education reformer, who promoted equality for women.
 Rachel Wacholder Scott (1975–), American beach volleyball player 
 Randolph Scott (1898–1987), American actor
 Ray Scott, several people
 Raymond Scott (1908–1994), American composer, band leader, pianist, engineer, recording studio maverick, and electronic instrument inventor
 Richard Scott, several people
 Rick Scott (born 1952), American businessman and politician, US Senator, Governor of Florida
 Ridley Scott (born 1937), English film director and producer, brother of Tony
 Robert Scott, several people
 Rodney Scott (actor) (born 1978), American actor 
 Rodney Scott (pitmaster) (born 1971). American chef and barbecue pitmaster  
 Romano Scott,(born 1985), South African Footballer
 Ronald Bodley Scott (1906–1982), English physician
 Samuel Gilbert Scott (c. 1813–1841), American daredevil
 Seann William Scott (born 1976), American film actor
 Sonny Scott, American country blues guitarist, singer and songwriter
 Selina Scott (born 1951), English television news presenter
 Septimus Edwin Scott (1879–1965), English painter
 Sherie Rene Scott (born 1967), American actress, singer, and writer
 Sophie Scott (born 1994), British singer-songwriter, Sophie and the Giants 
 Stephen Scott (writer) (1948–2011), American Anabaptist writer
 Stuart Scott (1965–2015), American sports journalist
 Tanner Scott (born 1994), American baseball player
 Tayler Scott (born 1992), South African baseball player
 T.J. Scott, actor
 Thomas Scott, several people
 Tim Scott (born 1965), American politician, US Senator from South Carolina
 Tommy Scott (coach) (1907–1962), American college sports coach
 Tony Scott (1944–2012), English film director and producer, brother of Ridley
 Trent Scott (born 1994), American football player
 Tyler Scott (born 1985), Canadian football player
 Vernon Scott (born 1997), American football player
 Walter Scott, several people
 Wendi Michelle Scott (born 1975), American criminal convicted of abusing her daughter in a case of Münchausen syndrome by proxy
 Willard Scott (1934–2021), American actor, author, media personality, clown, and comedian
 William Scott, several people
 Winfield Scott (1786–1866), United States Army general and US presidential candidate
 Zachary Scott (1914–1965), American actor

Fictional characters
 Alan Scott, Golden Age Green Lantern
 Heather Scott, a character in the 1989 American action comedy movie Speed Zone
 Michael Scott (The Office), character in The Office
 Montgomery "Scotty" Scott, character in Star Trek
 Jason Lee Scott, a character in the American TV show Power Rangers
 Lucas Scott, Nathan Scott, Haley James Scott and James Lucas Scott, characters in One Tree Hill on CW

See also
 Scotty (disambiguation), contains list of people with given name and surname Scotty
 Scottie (disambiguation), contains list of people with given name Scottie
 Scot (given name)
 Scot (surname)

References 

English-language surnames
Celtic-language surnames
Ethnonymic surnames